Vanda Juhász (born 6 June 1989 in Dunaújváros) is a Hungarian javelin thrower. She competed in the javelin throw event at the 2012 Summer Olympics.  Her personal best is 59.31 m, set in 2012 in Szekszárd.

References

Sportspeople from Dunaújváros
Hungarian female javelin throwers
1989 births
Living people
Olympic athletes of Hungary
Athletes (track and field) at the 2012 Summer Olympics
People from Dunaújváros
21st-century Hungarian women